The Qingdao Golf Open was a golf tournament on the Challenge Tour, played in China. It was held in 2008 at the Qingdao Huashan Golf & Resort, in Qingdao.

With a prize fund of US$500,000 it was one of the richest events on the Challenge Tour.

Winners

External links
Coverage on the Challenge Tour's official site

Former Challenge Tour events
Golf tournaments in China